Green Meadow Waldorf School (GMWS) is an independent Waldorf school located in Chestnut Ridge, Rockland County, New York. It offers parent and child classes, and nursery/kindergarten through 12th grades. The school is accredited by both the New York State Association of Independent Schools and the Association of Waldorf Schools of North America. Founded in 1950, it is one of the oldest of the approximately 190 independent North American Waldorf schools (there are about 1,000 such schools worldwide).

Curriculum
The school practices an interdisciplinary approach based on the Waldorf curriculum, including a strong emphasis on art, music and intercultural understanding; students begin studying two foreign languages (Spanish and German) beginning in first grade. It also provides a strong community service program. Graduates of the school have been noted for their independence, sensitivity and creativity.

Publications and events

The school's publications include:

 A monthly bulletin
 A student literary magazine, The Burning Bush
 An alumni quarterly
 A yearbook created by students and staff

The school's annual public events include the following:
Fall Fair
Goods and Services Auction and Dinner

Notable alumni
Kate Christensen (class of 1980) received the 2008 PEN/Faulkner Award for Fiction.

Stefan Schaefer has directed more than fifteen feature films.

Neil Perry Gordon has written several historical fiction novels.

Larger community
Green Meadow is part of the Threefold Educational Foundation anthroposophical community in Chestnut Ridge. The Foundation owns the land and acts as an umbrella for Green Meadow Walfdorf School and several other nearby organizations. This community includes:
 The Threefold Foundation, which acts as trustee of the land and provides affordable housing for community members.
 Sunbridge Institute, a Waldorf teacher training institution.
 The Fellowship Community is a licensed State of New York adult care facility and an inter-generational, anthroposophically based community where people of all ages live with, assist, and care for the elderly. Here, Green Meadow pupils receive hands-on experiences of farming and gardening.
 The Pfeiffer Center, a training center for biodynamic agriculture.
 Eurythmy Spring Valley, a eurythmy school of performance art.
 The Hungry Hollow Food Co-op, a natural food store founded by Green Meadow Waldorf School parents in 1973 and specializing in organic foods.

Legal controversy
During a 2019 measles epidemic, Rockland County excluded unvaccinated students from schools. A lawsuit was filed on behalf of the families of excluded children; in the decision, Judge Thorsen wrote that “petitioners’ children are hereby permitted to return to their respective schools forthwith and otherwise assemble in public places,” allowing Green Meadow Waldorf School to welcome 45 unvaccinated students back to class.

Sexual abuse scandal 
In July 2013, alumna and novelist Kate Christensen published “Blue Plate Special”, an autobiography in which she describes how she had been sexually abused by a teacher she referred to as “Tomcat.” Staff of Green Meadow Waldorf School identified Tomcat as John Alexandra, a former teacher employed between 1965 and 1979, Threefold Board member from 1975 through 1983 and who continued to appear on campus occasionally until 2013. The school hired a professional firm, T&M Protection Resources, to investigate the matter and the results were reported on July 11, 2014 in The Journal News.

See also
Waldorf education
Curriculum of the Waldorf schools

References

Additional articles
 Third-graders make prayer flags for Bhutanese school, Rockland Journal News, June 13, 2007
Learning English as a second language at Chestnut Ridge school, Rockland Journal News, April 13, 2007
"Immigrants Share Some Personal Accounts with Green Meadow Students", Rockland County Times, June 1–7, 2006. pp. 1–2.

External links 
 Green Meadow Waldorf School
 Sunbridge College
 Fellowship Community
 School of Eurythmy
 Association of Waldorf Schools of North America
 Why Waldorf Works

Waldorf schools in the United States
Private high schools in New York (state)
Private middle schools in New York (state)
Private elementary schools in New York (state)
Educational institutions established in 1950
1950 establishments in New York (state)